Ásgerður Stefanía "Adda" Baldursdóttir (born 5 January 1987) is an Icelandic footballer who plays for Valur of the Úrvalsdeild kvenna. She also plays for the Iceland women's national team.

Club career 

In 2015 she was loaned to Kristianstads DFF and played five Damallsvenskan matches for the Swedish club, before returning for the start of the Iceland season in May. She agreed to join Kristianstads permanently in January 2016, but then changed her mind and decided to stay with Stjarnan.

Ásgerður missed the 2017 Úrvalsdeild season due to pregnancy.

International career 

Ásgerður was called into the Iceland national team for the first time in September 2013. Incoming national coach Freyr Alexandersson called up six Stjarnan players following the club's successful season. She made her debut in a 2–1 defeat to Germany at the Algarve Cup in March 2014.

Personal life 

In September 2014 Ásgerður was in a relationship with footballer Almarr Ormarsson.

References

External links 
 
 
  
 

1987 births
Living people
Asgerdur Baldursdottir
Asgerdur Baldursdottir
Asgerdur Baldursdottir
Damallsvenskan players
Kristianstads DFF players
Expatriate women's footballers in Sweden
Asgerdur Baldursdottir
Asgerdur Baldursdottir
Asgerdur Baldursdottir
Women's association football midfielders